Leifchild Stratten Leif-Jones, 1st Baron Rhayader, PC ( Leifchild Stratten Jones;
16 January 1862 – 26 September 1939), known as Leif Jones before his elevation to the peerage in 1932, was a British Temperance movement leader and Liberal politician.

Background and education
Born Leifchild Stratten Jones on 16 January 1862 in St Pancras, London, the fifth of the six children of Thomas Jones (1819–1882), an Independent clergyman, formerly of Morriston, Swansea, and Jane Jones, daughter of John Jones of Dowlais. His older siblings were David Brynmor (b. 1851), Annie, John Viriamu (b. 1862) and Irvonwy; his younger brother was Morlais Glasfryn. His brothers David Brynmor Jones and John Viriamu Jones would both achieve prominence in public life.  

In 1867, when Leifchild was five years old, his mother died, and, in 1869, his father left London, for health reasons, moving firstly back to Swansea (1870–1877) and afterwards to Melbourne, Australia (1877–1880), where Leifchild was educated at Scotch College, Melbourne, from 31 July 1877 to December 1878. Afterwards Leifchild became a student at Trinity College, Oxford.

Member of Parliament and temperance campaigner
From 1905 to January 1910 Leif Jones served as Member of Parliament for Appleby, in Westmorland. Whilst an MP he voted in favour of the 1908 Women's Enfranchisement Bill.

From December 1910 to 1918 he served as Member for Rushcliffe, in Nottinghamshire. In 1917 he was sworn of the Privy Council. From 1923 to 1924 and from 1929 to 1931 he served as Member for Camborne, in Cornwall.

On 25 January 1932 Jones was elevated to the peerage as Baron Rhayader, of Rhayader in the County of Radnor. So that he might continue to be known by the familiar name of 'Leif Jones' he had earlier that month changed his surname by deed poll from 'Jones' to 'Leif-Jones'.

Despite his long political career Leif Jones is best remembered as a temperance leader. He was President of the United Kingdom Alliance (UKA), the leading British prohibitionist organisation, between 1906 and 1932. He had earlier been private secretary to the Countess of Carlisle, a prominent prohibitionist campaigner. As a temperance campaigner Leif Jones was sometimes referred to as 'Tea-leaf Jones'.

Lord Rhayader died in Marylebone, London, in September 1939, aged 77, when the barony became extinct.

Photographic portraits of Lord Rhayader may be seen at the National Portrait Gallery, London.

References

External links 
 
ODNB article by David M. Fahey, 'Jones, Leifchild Stratten, Baron Rhayader (1862–1939)’, Oxford Dictionary of National Biography, online edn, Oxford University Press, May 2006 accessed 1 July 2010

Further reading
 D.M. Fahey, 'Leif Jones', in Biographical Dictionary of Modern British Radicals, Vol. 3 (1870-1974) (1988)
 M.H.C. Haylor, The Vision of a Century, 1853-1953: the United Kingdom Alliance in historical perspective (1953)
 G.B. Wilson, Leif Jones, Lord Rhayader, Temperance Reformer and Statesman (1948)

1862 births
1939 deaths
Alumni of Trinity College, Oxford
Liberal Party (UK) MPs for English constituencies
Members of the Privy Council of the United Kingdom
Rhyader, Leif Jones, 1st Baron
UK MPs 1900–1906
UK MPs 1906–1910
UK MPs 1910–1918
UK MPs 1923–1924
UK MPs 1929–1931
UK MPs who were granted peerages
People from St Pancras, London
Members of the Parliament of the United Kingdom for Camborne
British temperance activists
Barons created by George V